Alawar Entertainment is an international developer, distributor, and publisher of video games for PC, mobile platforms, games consoles and other devices based in Lewes, Delaware. Its main areas of activity are mid-core games for experienced players, as well as casual downloadable and F2P games for PC, MacOS, IOS, Android, PlayStation (console), Xbox, social networks, and other platforms.

The company's games have sold more than 1 billion copies in over 100 countries and 10 different languages.

History 

 The company was founded in 1999 by Novosibirsk State University students Alexander Lyskovsky (who later founded iFarm) and Sergey Zanin. Game development was the first department of the company. Alawar released two games: Puzzle Rally and Bubble Bobble Nostalgie.
 2001 saw the release of Magic Ball, the first 3D arkanoid-style game developed by Dream Dale studio in Irkutsk. The game proved popular and Alawar began developing rapidly. Magic Ball was localized into several languages and ported to PlayStation consoles and iOS. Alawar went on to release several sequels to the game.
 Alawar started developing its own distribution platform in 2003. The company started work on shareware games under its "casual" banner.
 In 2006, Alawar became one of the first companies to support SMS payments in Russia for its products.
 In 2008, the first games in the Farm Frenzy and The Treasures of Montezuma franchises were released. By the end of 2008, Alawar included four studios – Dream Dale, Stargaze, Five-BN and Friday's Games – and had established partnerships with Mail.ru, Rambler, and Euroset.ru.
 In 2009, the company started developing and porting games for mobile devices, games consoles and social networks. The games were promoted via the App Store, Google Play, the PlayStation Network and other major services. In August 2009, Alawar and Oleg Kuvaev signed a cooperation agreement, which gave Alawar exclusive rights to use the Masyanya
 brand in games until 2014.
 In 2010, Alawar released around 15 projects for the iPhone and iPad. The Treasures of Montezuma on iOS went on to become a top 2 iPad game and a top 20 iPhone game in the United States.
 In 2011, Alawar expanded production and started to focus on publishing multi-platform games for release on PC, Mac, iOS, Android, and PSP Minis. The same year marked the beginning of a series of projects based around the Technopark in Novosibirsk Akademgorodok aimed at educating interested parties on game studio creation and providing consultations with experienced game developers.
 In 2012, Alawar began development on a number of free-to-play projects. 2012 saw the release of The Treasures of Montezuma Blitz on PS Vita. In doing so, Alawar became the first third-party publisher to release a game with free distribution and micro transactions on Sony consoles.
 In 2015, Alawar began developing mid-core games to release on Steam.
 In 2016, the company published Beholder, a game aimed at simulating life in a totalitarian state. Later that year, Beholder won the Excellence in Game Design and Best Indie Game categories at the DevGAMM independent games conference in Minsk. Also in 2016, one of the company's internal development teams began work on new kinds of projects using VR and its own software solutions. Sammy, a VR horror game, was released and went on to become one of the top 3 most downloaded games worldwide, and was included in the list of Best New Gear VR Games.
 In 2017, the company released Distrust, an adventure strategy and survival simulator set in an Arctic station where mysterious events unfold. The Blissful Sleep downloadable content for Beholder was also released and served as a prequel to the main game. The DLC included many characters from the original campaign.
 In 2018, Alawar and the Spanish Fictiorama Studios (Dead Synchronicity) released a major publishing project, Do Not Feed The Monkeys. The game, dubbed a "digital voyeur simulator", imitates the style of 1990s video games with pixel graphics, crude fonts, and minimal refinements. The same year marked the release of I am not a Monster, a retro sci-fi-styled turn-based tactical strategy. The game quickly gained popularity and positive reviews on Steam. Beholder 2 was released in December 2018. While it shares the same universe as the original game, it is not a direct continuation of its story.
 In 2019, Alawar developed and published the free-to-play battle royale shooter Watchers (servers shut down in August 2021), as well as Space Robinson, a hardcore action game with roguelike elements.
 In 2021, Alawar published a 2D narrative detective Song of Farca. Later this year the company released a 2D action platformer They Always Run by its own production.
 In 2022, Alawar released the third chapter of the Beholder saga. In April, the company announced the development of Necrosmith, an indirect necromancer simulator.

Areas of activity

Development 

Alawar has been engaged in game development since 1999.

 Mid-core games. These are more sophisticated, deeper and smarter than classic casual games, but aren't as large-scale as Triple-A projects. Mid-core games generally appeal more to experienced players. Alawar releases 2–3 mid-core projects per year. Major projects include Beholder and Distrust.
 Casual games for PC and MacBook. This is the longest-running area of development for Alawar. The company has released over 500 projects in genres such as time management, hidden object puzzle adventure (HOPA), and match-3. Alawar's casual games are available for Windows and Mac OS (with over 70 games available in the Mac App Store). Major projects include The Treasures of Montezuma, Farm Frenzy, The House of the 1000 Doors, and more. Alawar collaborates on these projects with BigFishGames, GameHouse, WildTangent, iWin and other casual portals.
 Mobile games. Since 2009, Alawar has been porting its games to popular mobile platforms such as iOS, Android, Windows Mobile, and others. The company also releases original (ShakeSpears!, Montezuma Blitz, Farm Frenzy: New Adventures, etc.) and licensed (Heroes War, etc.) free-to-play games for mobile devices.
 Console games. Since 2010, Alawar has been porting mid-core and casual projects to all current consoles and operating systems (PlayStation, Nintendo Switch, Xbox, iOS, Android, etc.).
 Experimental games (VR). Alawar's internal development team is involved in projects for Samsung Gear VR, Google Daydream and Google Cardboard. Sammy, its first VR game, was released in May 2017 and went on to become one of the top 3 most downloaded games worldwide, and was included in the list of Best New Gear VR Games. As of 2020, the company's activities in the VR field have been put on hold.

Publishing 

Alawar has been engaged in publishing since 1999.

The publishing division collaborates with game studios and companies to produce mid-core games for various platforms and to share its experience in developing and launching new projects.

Alawar is currently cooperating with over 30 development companies. Over 500 game projects have been released, including bestselling titles such as Do Not Feed The Monkeys, Space Robinson, and Song of Farca.

Distribution 

Alawar has a distribution network for casual content through its website and affiliate program, which includes over 5,000 partners such as Mail.ru, Rambler.ru, and others.

Since 2004, over 1 billion casual games have been sold through the websites of Alawar and its partners, which have a monthly active audience in excess of 16 million users.

Alawar is an active participant in industry conferences such as GDC, CasualConnect, GameConnection, Gamescom, White Nights, DevGAMM, and more.

Awards and achievements 

 2008 — Farm Frenzy was named the best casual game at the Game Developers Conference 2008
 2008 — Alawar won the Runet Prize 2008, the National Prize of the Russian Federation for contributions to the development of the Russian internet segment
 2012 — Alawar was listed 24th in the Forbes 30 Russian Internet Companies list
 2012 — Alawar was named best publisher at the Game Developers Conference
 2012 — The Treasures of Montezuma was named the best casual project at the Game Developers Conference in Moscow
 2013 — Alawar was listed 62nd in the Top 100 Russian Employers (62nd place) list by HeadHunter
 2016 — Beholder won the Excellence in Game Design and Best Indie Game categories at the DevGamm Independent Games Conference
 2016 — Alawar was named winner at the Game Developers Conference Pitch in San Francisco
 2017 — Beholder was named Most Creative and Original and Best Indie Game at the Game Connection America Conference
 2017 — Beholder was named one of the 8 winners in the Best in Play category at the Game Developers Conference
 2017 — Alawar became the official sponsor of the Siberia Game Dev Weekend Conference
 2017 — Do Not Feed The Monkeys received several awards: Best Narrative (DevGamm Conference, Minsk), Most Innovative (3DWire, Segovia), Best Indie Game (FEFFS, Strasbourg), DevGamm Choice (Get It! Conference, Odessa), Media Choice (Indiecade Europe, Paris)
 2019 — Do Not Feed The Monkeys was a finalist at the Independent Games Festival (IGF) in several categories: Innovative Game, Best Design and Grand Prix

Games developed

Games published

References

External links 
 

Video game companies established in 1999
Casual games
Video game publishers
Companies based in Delaware
Companies established in 1999
Video game development companies
Video game companies of Russia